Defending Jacob is an American crime drama miniseries, based on the 2012 novel of the same name by William Landay, produced by Apple TV+. The series was created and written by Mark Bomback and directed by Morten Tyldum. It stars Chris Evans, Michelle Dockery, Jaeden Martell, Cherry Jones, Pablo Schreiber, Betty Gabriel, Sakina Jaffrey and J.K. Simmons. It premiered on April 24, 2020, and concluded on May 29, 2020.

The series received generally favorable reviews from critics, who praised the performances (particularly those of Evans, Dockery and Martell), ambiguity, and emotional weight, but criticized the pacing, length and ending. The miniseries was released on Blu-ray and DVD on July 6, 2021, by Paramount Home Entertainment.

Premise
Defending Jacob tells the story of a family dealing with the accusation that their 14-year-old son may be a murderer.

Cast

Main
 Chris Evans as Andrew "Andy" Stephen Barber
 Michelle Dockery as Laurie Barber
 Jaeden Martell as Jacob "Jake" Barber
 Cherry Jones as Joanna Klein
 Pablo Schreiber as Neal Logiudice
 Betty Gabriel as Pam Duffy
 Sakina Jaffrey as Lynn Canavan

Recurring
 J. K. Simmons as William "Bloody Billy" Barber
 Daniel Henshall as Leonard Patz
 Ben Taylor as Derek Yoo
 Jordan Alexa Davis as Sarah Grohl
 Megan Byrne as Joan Rifkin
 Christopher Buckner as Young William "Bloody Billy" Barber (flashbacks)
 Patrick Fischler as Dan Rifkin
 Poorna Jagannathan as Dr. Vogel
 Lizzie Short as Marianne Barber (flashbacks)
 Evan Risser as Young Andy Barber (flashbacks)
 William Xifaras as Father James O’Leary
 Lenny Clarke as Food Truck Guy
 Michelle D. Violette as Paula Gianetto

Episodes
{{Episode table |background=#000000 |overall= |title= |director= |writer= |writerT=Teleplay by |airdate= |airdateR= |released=y |country=U.S. |episodes=

{{Episode list
 |EpisodeNumber   = 4
 |Title           = Damage Control
 |DirectedBy      = Morten Tyldum
 |WrittenBy       = Mark Bomback
 |OriginalAirDate = 
 |ShortSummary    = Andy visits the home of a teenager, Matt, who accused Leonard Patz of sexually assaulting him. Andy attempts to question Matt but the visit turns confrontational and Matt's defensive behaviour leads Andy to believe he's hiding something. Later, Andy follows Patz to his apartment and takes note of his address. At home, Andy is pleased to find Sarah visiting Jacob; later that night, Jacob tells him that Sarah believes Derek killed Ben and that the police conducted a second interview with Derek. Privately, Jacob creates a secret Instagram account despite his parents' rules banning him from social media. Meanwhile, Laurie is becoming increasingly unstable, spying on her former coworkers and lying to Andy about having dinner with a friend when she actually ate alone at a diner. At the diner, she is approached by a friendly woman whom she confides in; when the woman reveals herself to be a freelance writer working on a story for The Boston Globe'''s Sunday Magazine, Laurie leaves in a panic without insisting her comments were given off the record and does not tell Andy about the incident. Dr. Vogel conducts multiple tests to determine any psychopathic tendencies in Jacob and takes a DNA sample from Andy. Dr. Vogel reveals that they also need a DNA sample from Andy's father, but that he will only provide a sample if Andy obtains it himself. Andy, despite his anger and fear of his father, agrees.
 |LineColor       = 000
}}

}}

Production
Development
On September 20, 2018, it was announced that Apple had given a straight-to-series order consisting of eight episodes to a television miniseries adaptation of William Landay's 2012 novel Defending Jacob. The series was created by Mark Bomback who also wrote the series and executive produced alongside Chris Evans, Morten Tyldum, Rosalie Swedlin, and Adam Shulman. Tyldum also directed the series as well. Production companies involved with the series consist of Paramount Television and Anonymous Content.

Casting
Alongside the series order announcement, it was confirmed that Chris Evans had been cast in the series' lead role. In March 2019, Michelle Dockery and Jaeden Martell joined the cast of the series. In April 2019, Cherry Jones, Pablo Schreiber, Betty Gabriel and Sakina Jaffrey joined the cast of the series. J. K. Simmons was revealed as part of the cast in a March 2020 trailer.

Filming
Filming was confirmed to commence in Newton, Massachusetts––the city in which the novel takes place––in April 2019. Three locations were confirmed for filming: Cold Spring Park, the village of Newton Highlands, and the UMass Amherst Mount Ida Campus.  Additional filming began in Belmont, Massachusetts. Filming also began in Salem, Massachusetts, on June 15, 2019, as well as at MCI Cedar Junction in Walpole, Massachusetts, on June 17, 2019, and in Lowell, Massachusetts, by the UMass Lowell Tsongas Arena on June 19, 2019. Filming took place at River's Edge in Medford, Massachusetts, on June 21, 2019. Filming also commenced on June 28, 2019, in Worcester, Massachusetts, and on July 8, 2019, in Watertown, Massachusetts, where the facade of the old Watertown Police Station appears as the Newton Police Station in the series. Filming took place on July 9, 2019, at the Town Diner in Watertown. On July 18, 2019, they filmed at C&M Pizza in Leominster, Massachusetts. Neighborhood scenes were filmed in Needham, Massachusetts. The scenes in Mexico were filmed on September 25, 2019, at the Grand Velas hotel in Nuevo Vallarta, in the state of Nayarit. Scenes were also filmed in Waltham on the property of Northgate Gardens Condominium.

Reception
Critical response
On Rotten Tomatoes, the series' approval rating is 72% based on reviews from 61 critics, with an average rating of 6.68/10. The website's critical consensus is, "Despite outstanding work from Michelle Dockery and Chris Evans, Defending Jacob'' stretches its source material too thin, undermining its own rich tension with too much melodramatic padding." On Metacritic, the series has a weighted average score of 61 out of 100 based on reviews from 23 critics, indicating "generally favorable reviews". The series has reportedly become the second most popular Apple TV+ show.

Accolades

References

External links
  – official site
 
 
 

2020 American television series debuts
2020 American television series endings
2020s American drama television miniseries
English-language television shows
Apple TV+ original programming
Television series by Anonymous Content
Television series by Paramount Television
Television shows filmed in Massachusetts
Television shows based on American novels
Television shows set in Massachusetts